Roy English, also known as Jagwar Twin, is an American singer, songwriter, musician and record producer.

Previously, English was a member of the band Dead Letter Diaries, before founding the bands Eye Alaska and Canary Dynasty. Going solo in 2015, English has since written and produced music alongside other industry artists, including Jeff Bhasker, Teddy Riley, Rick Nowels , Matt Wallace, Dave Sitek, and Alesso. English's debut studio album, Subject to Flooding, was released on 21 September 2018 in collaboration with producers S1 and Linus, and featured contributions from Travis Barker of blink-182.

History

2004–2011: Early History 
Roy English began his musical career under his birth name as a member of the band Dead Letter Diaries. In 2006, Roy became one of the founding members of the American indie-rock band Eye Alaska, which also included Cameron Trowbridge, Christopher Osegueda, Chase Kensrue, and Han Ko. The band toured the United States from 2007 to 2011, releasing their EP Yellow & Elephant and their 2009 album Genesis Underground, before disbanding.

2012–2017: Solo debut and I'm Not Here Pt. 1 
In 2012, following the disbandment of Eye Alaska, English contemplated departing his career in music, before meeting Jeff Bhasker. Becoming a mentor, Bhasker helped English shape his songwriting and production skills. In 2014, alongside S1 and Rick Nowels, English produced Lana Del Rey's 2014 single “I Can Fly”. The song was featured in Tim Burton's movie Big Eyes the same year.

On 22 January 2015, English released a single titled “Julianne” English also co-wrote and was featured on Alesso's single "Cool." Released February 13, 2015 on BBC Radio 1, “Cool” peaked at number 10 in the UK Singles Chart and number 3 on the UK Dance Chart. The track charted number 14 on Billboard's US Dance/Electronic Songs charts and number 2 on both Billboard's US Dance Club Songs and Dance/Mix Show Airplay.

Immediately after, English was featured on "Tongue Tied July” with Michael Brun. On 26 April 2016, English released his EP I'm Not Here Pt. 1, which included three new songs: "Wasted Youth", "Can't Lie" and "Oxy." In May of the same year, English released a stripped-down version of “Can't Lie” and was announced as the opening act for 5 Seconds of Summer during their Sounds Live Feels Live World Tour on select North American dates.

In March 2017, English released "Hotel Pools 01101001", performing it on NBC's Today after being chosen as Elvis Duran's Artist of the Month. The song was officially remixed by Badhabit and shortly after also by producer A.K. Tribe. A few months later, English released "Outa My Head 01101110", a collaboration with DJ and producer Badhabit.

2018–present: Jagwar Twin and Subject to Flooding 
Following the release of "Outa My Head 01101110", English began working with producers S1, Linus and Travis Barker of blink-182.  English traveled from Joshua Tree and Haiti to Ireland's coast and Florence, Italy for recording sessions.

English, under the name of Jagwar Twin, released his debut single “Loser” on September 7, 2018, after writing it around 2017. Released by Zane Lowe on Beats 1, the track amassed over 100k streams in its first 24 hours. “Loser” received radio play upon release and was picked up for playlisting on Spotify, Apple Music and Amazon Music. Of the song's message, English has explained, "We're all on this beautiful planet. We're made of the same stardust. We're all losers, and we're also all brilliant, beautiful souls."

In 2019, English embarked on a headlining tour, titled the "Live in Close Proximity" tour. The tour consisted of 8 dates, all in the US, beginning on 20 July 2019 in Anaheim, California at The Parish at House of Blues and concluded on 30 August 2019, in Seattle, Washington at the Bumbershoot festival.

On 24 April 2020, English performed at Elvis Duran's Stay at Home Ball with Calum Hood of 5 Seconds of Summer.

On 8 June 2020, English released a music video for his 2018 single, "Shine".

On 21 December 2020, English released a music video for his song "Happy Face", which features Josh Dun of alternative rock band Twenty One Pilots on drums.

On 30 September 2022, English released a new album, titled "33", which had 10 songs, including a collaboration with little luna ("Pay Attention"). The album was released by Big Loud Records and included previously released singles including "Happy Face", "I Like to Party" and "Down to You".

Discography

Albums

Extended plays

Singles

Tours

Opening Act 

 5 Seconds of Summer – Sounds Live Feels Live World Tour (2016) (Select North American dates only)
 Lovelytheband – Finding It Hard to Smile Tour (2019)
 Avril Lavigne – Head Above Water Tour (2019)

Headlining 

 Live in Close Proximity Tour (2019)

References 

1988 births
American electronic musicians
American indie pop musicians
American male singer-songwriters
Record producers from California
Living people
Singers from Los Angeles
21st-century American singers
21st-century American male singers
Singer-songwriters from California